Daniel Sparks may refer to:
 Dan Sparks (born 1968), Minnesota politician and member of the Minnesota Senate
 Dan Sparks (basketball) (born 1945), American basketball player and college coach
 Daniel Sparks (politician) (born 1975), American politician in the Mississippi State Senate